Chronic Town is a 2008 American drama film written by Michael Kamsky, directed by Tom Hines and starring JR Bourne.

Cast
JR Bourne as Truman
Emily Wagner as Eleanor
Jeffrey Scott Jensen as Faraday
Alice Drummond as Elizabeth
Dan Butler as Blow Job
Paul Dooley as Eleanor's Father
Garry Marshall as The Doctor
Lin Shaye as Nurse
Stacy Edwards as Emily
Robert Peters as Newton
Ian Gregory as Max
Christine Lakin as Kelly
Rowan Joseph as Roger
Chris Wynne as Peter

Reception
Robert Koehler of Variety gave the film a positive review, writing that it "exudes observed experience."

Justin Lowe of The Hollywood Reporter also gave the film a positive review and wrote, "With biting humor and refreshing humanism, Hines takes a cold-eyed look at credible individuals struggling with addiction and dysfunction."

References

External links
 
 

2000s English-language films